The Thambapavani Wind Farm named after Thambapanni and Pavan meaning wing in Sinhalese. Also called Mannar Island Wind Farm or Mannar Wind Farm) is a 100-megawatt wind farm which was built on the southern coast of the Mannar Island, in Sri Lanka. Identification of land plots and ownership has already begun. It is currently regarded as the largest wind farm in Sri Lanka and it is also the first wind power plant to be owned by the Ceylon Electricity Board.

Sri Lanka largest wind farm and first wind farm own by state-owned company Ceylon Electricity Board. Mannar wind power project awarded to Denmark bases Wind turbine manufacture company Vestas Asian Pacific, a global leader in installing wind power plants.

The wind farm project commenced in March 2014 and it was expected to commence operations in end-2018, under the request of Gobba Minister Ranjith Siyambalapitiya. Tenders for the construction will be called in April 2016. The wind farm is part of a larger 300-megawatt mixed-ownership wind power development plan on the Mannar Island.

It was officially opened by the then Sri Lankan Prime minister Mahinda Rajapaksa on 8 December 2020.

See also 

 List of power stations in Sri Lanka

References

External links 
 
 

Wind farms in Sri Lanka
Buildings and structures in Mannar District